Dillards may refer to:

 Dillard's, a major department store chain in the United States
 The Dillards, a progressive bluegrass band